Ohey is a municipality of Wallonia located in the province of Namur, Belgium.

On 1 January 2006 the municipality had 4,283 inhabitants. The total area is 56.62 km² (21.9 sq mi), giving a population density of 76 inhabitants per km² (195.5/sq mi).

The municipality is composed of the following districts: Évelette, Goesnes, Haillot, Jallet, Ohey, Perwez.

Also located in Ohey are the villages of Bois-Dame-Agis, Ève, Filée, La Bouchaille, Libois, Résimont, Saint-Mort and Tahier.

See also
 List of protected heritage sites in Ohey

References

External links
 
Official website (in French)

Municipalities of Namur (province)